Windsor Hills or Windsor Hill or variant may refer to:

United Kingdom
 Windsor Hill, a biological Site of Special Scientific Interest in Buckinghamshire
 Windsor Hill Marsh, a biological Site of Special Scientific Interest in Somerset
 Windsor Hill Quarry, a geological Site of Special Scientific Interest in Somerset

United States
 Windsor Hills, a subdivision of the View Park-Windsor Hills, California,  census-designated place
 Windsor Hills, a neighborhood of Forest Park, Baltimore
 Windsor Hills Historic District, Baltimore, Maryland
 Windsor Hills, Austin, Texas
 Windsor Hills, Delaware
 Windsor Hills, a camp in Windsor, New Hampshire
 Windsor Hills, a vacation resort  community in Kissimmee, Florida

See also
 Windsor (disambiguation)
 East Windsor Hill Historic District
 Windsor Hill Primary School
 Windsor Mountain School